The Pakistan Environmental Protection Agency (abbreviated as Pak-EPA), is an executive agency of the Government of Pakistan managed by the Ministry of Climate Change. The agency is charged with protecting human health and the environment by writing and enforcing regulation based on laws passed by Parliament. The Pak-EPA was proposed by the Prime Minister Nawaz Sharif; it began operations in 1997 after Parliament passed a law to establish a federal executive agency. The agency is led by an appointed director-general, who is appointed by the Prime Minister on the advice of the Minister of Climate Change.The current director-general is Farzana Altaf Shah. Pak-EPA is not a Cabinet department, but the director-general is normally given the cabinet rank. Farzana Altaf Shah was recently promoted to the cabinet rank. She is the first female Director General appointed on 17 October 2016.

See also 
 Cabinet Secretariat (Pakistan)

References

External links 
 Pakistan Environmental Protection Agency

Nature conservation in Pakistan
Environmental organisations based in Pakistan
Environmental protection agencies
1997 establishments in Pakistan
Government agencies established in 1997
Regulatory authorities of Pakistan